The following list of Carnegie libraries in Vermont provides detailed information on United States Carnegie libraries in Vermont, where 4 public libraries were built from 4 grants (totaling $80,000) awarded by the Carnegie Corporation of New York from 1901 to 1911. In addition, one academic library was built.

Key

Public libraries

Academic library

Notes

References

Note: The above references, while all authoritative, are not entirely mutually consistent. Some details of this list may have been drawn from one of the references without support from the others.  Reader discretion is advised.

External links
New England Carnegies

Vermont
 
Libraries
Libraries